Grove Park is an unincorporated community in Alachua County, Florida, United States, on Florida State Road 20 west of Hawthorne.

Grove Park was established in the early 1880s on the Florida Southern Railway. In 1888, the community had 250 residents, a railroad station, post office, two stores, a hotel, school, church and a saw and planing mill.

The post office was opened in 1883, and closed in 1958.

References

Unincorporated communities in Alachua County, Florida
Unincorporated communities in Florida